Thierry B.R. Chopin is a phycologist and professor of aquaculture at the University of New Brunswick, Saint John.

Awards and honours
 Chevalier of the Ordre du Mérite Maritime
 Chevalier of the Ordre des Palmes académiques
 Honorary Consul of France

References

External links
 

Living people
Chevaliers of the Ordre des Palmes Académiques
Academic staff of the University of New Brunswick
University of Western Brittany alumni
Year of birth missing (living people)